This is a list of the highest points of the Federal Subjects of the Russian Federation.

List

Above 1000 m

Below 1000 m

See also
 List of mountains and hills of Russia
 List of European ultra-prominent peaks
 List of Ultras of Central Asia
 List of ultras of Northeast Asia

Notes

 
Russia
Russia